Moccasin Kill is a river in the state of New York. It flows into the Mohawk River by Rotterdam.

References

Rivers of Schenectady County, New York
Rivers of New York (state)